Skegness Lifeboat Station is a lifeboat station located in the town of Skegness, Lincolnshire, England, operated by the Royal National Lifeboat Institution (RNLI). The station is located on the seafront of the south-east coast, north of the Wash and south of the Humber Estuary. This area of the British coastline is characterised by many shoals and constantly changing sandbanks, many of which lie between the town and the East Dudgeon Lightship. The building dates from 1990 and was the first in the British Isles constructed especially for a Mersey-class lifeboat. The boathouse also accommodates an Inshore Lifeboat and a souvenir shop.

, there are two lifeboats stationed at Skegness, the Inshore  Lifeboat RNLB The Holland Family (D-842) and the  All-Weather Boat RNLB Joel and April Grunnill (ON 1324).

History 

The first lifeboat service in Skegness was organized by the Lincolnshire Coast Shipwreck Association who placed a lifeboat at the Gibraltar Point coastguard station. In 1859 the lifeboat and boathouse was moved from Gibraltar Point to a position in Skegness, among sand dunes to a location now called Lifeboat Avenue.

The station was taken under the control of the RNLI in 1864 who had a new boathouse constructed. The location of this first RNLI station was in Lifeboat Avenue, close to the original station. It is now a privately owned dwelling.

The RNLI built another boathouse in 1892, located on Skegness South Parade to the south of the clock tower. This boathouse had access doors for the lifeboat at either end of the building. There was also a watch room constructed on the first floor. This station was in use until 1990 when it was sold to a private buyer.

The RNLI placed an inshore lifeboat (ILB) at Skegness in May 1964. The ILB was kept in a small house close to the main beach until it was moved in 1990 to the new lifeboat station on the Tower Esplanade.

In 1990 it was decided that the cover for this area of the Lincolnshire coast would be greatly improved with the placing of a Mersey-class all-weather lifeboat at Skegness. To accommodate the new lifeboat a new purpose made station was constructed for the Mersey-class lifeboat on the Tower Esplanade. The inshore lifeboat was also placed within the same building as well as improved crew and equipment facilities. The building also included a souvenir shop to help with branch fund raising

On 20 May 2016, the Skegness D-class lifeboat, RNLB Peterborough Beer Festival IV (D-739) was taking part in a search for a missing person when a fire started on board. The fire spread rapidly, and after issuing a mayday, the crew abandoned the vessel, swimming  to shore while the lifeboat sank. The RNLI started recovery operations, but the damage was severe.

In May 2017, Shannon-class Joel and April Grunnill ON1324 (13-17) officially replaced the Mersey-class Lincolnshire Poacher. The new lifeboat cost £2.2 million. She was launched at ALC Poole on 9 September 2016, delivered to Skegness on 28 January 2017, and officially named on 27 May 2017. Funding came from the legacy of Joel Grunnill, and a donation from his cousin April Grunnill, both of whom had been volunteers with the station.

In 2019, D-class lifeboat The Holland Family (D-842) was donated by Robert Holland, in honour of his parents and wider family, who have been long-term volunteers at the station.

Notable rescues 
On 18 October 1854 the lifeboat crew launched to assist the stricken brig Atlanta, which had been driven onto the shore in a gale three miles north of Skegness. The Skegness lifeboat had to be drawn to the beach from town by six horses before her launch. The lifeboat rescued all aboard the Atlanta. The lifeboat's Coxswain was awarded an RNLI Silver Medal for the rescue.

On 5 December 1875 the lifeboat Herbert Ingram (first) launched at 6am to rescue the Colchester barge Star, which had been driven aground in a gale. The lifeboat took twenty minutes to reach the Star. Two crewmen were taken off the stricken vessel, but the Star's master fell into the water between the two boats. Two lifeboat crewmen went into the rough water with a line and held on to the master whilst the lifeboat was rowed to shore. For their bravery in this rescue both lifeboat crewmen were awarded RNLI silver medals.

On 9 November 1912, the Norwegian brig Azha suffered heavy storm damage off the Humber. Waterlogged and helpless, she drifted south for four days. Her crew were close to death when she was spotted, aground, on the Skegness Middle Sand. The “Samuel Lewis”, the station's last unpowered lifeboat, was launched to assist. Despite the severe weather, the lifeboat managed to get alongside the Azha and take off her crew. The brig was breaking up and was abandoned. King Haakon VII of Norway awarded the two lifeboat coxswains silver medals and written thanks.

On 27 December 1965, jackup oil rig Sea Gem collapsed 47 miles north-west of the Norfolk town of Cromer. Oakley-class lifeboat Charles Fred Grantham (ON 977) was one of several rescue boats launched the following day to search for the 32 crew of the Sea Gem. The search lasted 14 hours in high seas, freezing conditions, and gale-force wind. 19 of the Sea Gem crew were rescued, five confirmed deceased, and eight were never recovered. The RNLI sent the station a letter of appreciation for their part in the search.

Fleet

All weather boats

Inshore lifeboats

Talus MB-H launch tractor

Supacat SC-T11 system

Neighbouring stations

References 

Lifeboat stations in Lincolnshire
Skegness
Buildings and structures in Lincolnshire